Jenny Ovtcharov (née Mellström; born October 1, 1988) is a Swedish table tennis player.

Career
She grew up in the north of Sweden, Umeå, where her career started. She won Swedish youth championships in table tennis in 2002, 2003 and 2004. She played for the Swedish national team for 8 years.

Personal life
She is married to the Olympic medalist Dimitrij Ovtcharov. They have a daughter together, Emma.

References

1988 births
Living people
Swedish female table tennis players
Sportspeople from Stockholm
21st-century Swedish women